Live at the Village Vanguard is a live album by jazz drummer Elvin Jones recorded in 1968 at the Village Vanguard and released on the Enja label in 1974. It features Jones in a trio with tenor saxophonist George Coleman and bassist Wilbur Little. Trumpeter Hannibal Peterson appears on one track.

Reception
The Allmusic review by Scott Yanow described the musicianship on this album as "excellent and reasonably exploratory".

Track listing
 "By George" (George Coleman) - 7:06   
 "Laura" (David Raksin) - 12:00   
 "Mister Jones" (Keiko Jones) - 15:06   
 "You Don't Know What Love Is" (Don Raye, Gene de Paul) - 7:02

Personnel
Elvin Jones  - drums 
Hannibal Marvin Peterson - trumpet (track 3) 
George Coleman - tenor saxophone
Wilbur Little - bass

References

Elvin Jones live albums
1974 live albums
Enja Records live albums
Albums recorded at the Village Vanguard